Rogate was an electoral ward of Chichester District, West Sussex, England that returned one member to sit on Chichester District Council.

Following a district boundary review, it was split between the Fernhurst and Harting wards in 2019.

Councillor

Election results

* Elected unopposed

* Elected

References

External links
 Chichester District Council
 Election Maps

Former wards of Chichester District